Luciana Pedraza (born January 5, 1972) is an Argentine actress and director. She is married to American actor Robert Duvall, and is the granddaughter of Argentine aviation pioneer Susana Ferrari Billinghurst.

Early life
Born in the Argentine Northwest, in the city of Salta, she grew up in the province of Jujuy.

She is the oldest of five sisters. After graduating from the University of Buenos Aires with an MBA and minor in English she became the marketing director of W. & Associates. In 1996, while strolling down a street, she approached actor Robert Duvall to invite him to a party without knowing who he was. They share the same birthday 41 years apart.

Career
Pedraza wrote and directed the short documentary The Portrait of Billy Joe (2004) and appeared in the 2002 film Assassination Tango, which was written, produced, directed by, and starring her future husband Robert Duvall. She also appeared in another film of his, Wild Horses.

Later career

Luciana and Robert Duvall founded The Robert Duvall Children's Fund in 2001 to help impoverished children and families of Northern Argentina. Since then, the non-profit organization has expanded its reach to assist children and families around the world by partnering with reputable organizations. Among their organizations is Pro Mujer, a non-profit dedicated to helping Latin America's poorest women help themselves through micro-credit, business training and health care links.

References

External links
 
 

Argentine film actresses
People from Jujuy Province
Living people
Argentine people of German descent
Argentine people of English descent
1972 births